The 1988 Thayer Tutt Trophy was the third and last edition of the Thayer Tutt Trophy. It was held from March 20–27, 1988 in Eindhoven and Tilburg, Netherlands. Italy finished first, Japan finished second, and the Netherlands finished third.

First round

Group A

Group B

Final round

11th place
 -  8:1 (3:1, 3:0, 2:0)

9th place
 -  3:6 (2:2, 0:1, 1:3)

7th place
 -  3:9 (1:4, 2:3, 0:3

5th place
 -  6:9 (1:3, 2:6, 3:0)

3rd place
 -  4:2 (3:1, 1:1, 0:0)

Final
 -  3:0 (0:0, 1:0, 2:0)

References

External links
 Tournament on hockeyarchives.info

Thayer Tutt Trophy
1987–88 in Asian ice hockey
1988
1988 in Australian sport
1987–88 in Dutch ice hockey
March 1988 sports events in Europe
1988 Thayer
1988 Thayer
1988 Thayer